The 1985 Oklahoma State Cowboys baseball team represented the Oklahoma State University in the 1985 NCAA Division I baseball season. The Cowboys played their home games at Allie P. Reynolds Stadium. The team was coached by Gary Ward in his 8th year at Oklahoma State.

The Cowboys won the Midwest Regional to advance to the College World Series, where they were defeated by the Miami Hurricanes.

Roster

Schedule

! style="" | Regular Season
|- valign="top" 

|- bgcolor="#ffcccc"
| 1 || March 1 || at  || Red McEwen Field • Tampa, Florida || 11–12 || 0–1 || –
|- bgcolor="#ccffcc"
| 2 || March 2 || at South Florida || Red McEwen Field • Tampa, Florida || 11–8 || 1–1 || –
|- bgcolor="#ffcccc"
| 3 || March 2 || vs South Florida || Red McEwen Field • Tampa, Florida || 8–9 || 1–2 || –
|- bgcolor="#ccffcc"
| 4 || March 3 || vs  || Joker Marchant Stadium • Lakeland, Florida || 7–6 || 2–2 || –
|- bgcolor="#ffcccc"
| 5 || March 4 || vs  || Joker Marchant Stadium • Lakeland, Florida || 4–5 || 2–3 || –
|- bgcolor="#fffdd0"
| 6 || March 4 || vs Western Michigan || Joker Marchant Stadium • Lakeland, Florida || 2–2 || 2–3–1 || –
|- bgcolor="#ffcccc"
| 7 || March 5 || vs  || Joker Marchant Stadium • Lakeland, Florida || 6–9 || 2–4–1 || –
|- bgcolor="#ccffcc"
| 8 || March 6 || at  || Perry Field • Gainesville, Florida || 12–8 || 3–4–1 || –
|- bgcolor="#ccffcc"
| 9 || March 7 || vs Eastern Michigan || Joker Marchant Stadium • Lakeland, Florida || 7–6 || 4–4–1 || –
|- bgcolor="#ffcccc"
| 10 || March 8 || vs  || Perry Field • Gainesville, Florida || 6–11 || 4–5–1 || –
|- bgcolor="#ccffcc"
| 11 || March 9 || vs Stetson || Perry Field • Gainesville, Florida || 15–3 || 5–5–1 || –
|- bgcolor="#ccffcc"
| 12 || March 10 || vs  || Unknown • Miami, Florida || 13–11 || 6–5–1 || –
|- bgcolor="#ccffcc"
| 13 || March 11 || vs  || Unknown • Miami, Florida || 22–9 || 7–5–1 || –
|- bgcolor="#ccffcc"
| 14 || March 11 || vs  || Unknown • Miami, Florida || 13–1 || 8–5–1 || –
|- bgcolor="#ccffcc"
| 15 || March 12 || vs Maine || Unknown • Miami, Florida || 7–2 || 9–5–1 || –
|- bgcolor="#ccffcc"
| 16 || March 12 || vs  || Unknown • Miami, Florida || 11–2 || 10–5–1 || –
|- bgcolor="#ccffcc"
| 17 || March 13 || vs Maine || Unknown • Miami, Florida || 7–2 || 11–5–1 || –
|- bgcolor="#ccffcc"
| 18 || March 15 || vs St. Francis || Maestri Field at Privateer Park • New Orleans, Louisiana || 11–8 || 12–5–1 || –
|- bgcolor="#ccffcc"
| 19 || March 15 || vs St. Francis || Maestri Field at Privateer Park • New Orleans, Louisiana || 6–1 || 13–5–1 || –
|- bgcolor="#ffcccc"
| 20 || March 16 || at  || Maestri Field at Privateer Park • New Orleans, Louisiana || 0–7 || 13–6–1 || –
|- bgcolor="#ccffcc"
| 21 || March 23 ||  || Allie P. Reynolds Stadium • Stillwater, Oklahoma || 19–2 || 14–6–1 || 4–0
|- bgcolor="#ccffcc"
| 22 || March 23 || South Dakota State || Allie P. Reynolds Stadium • Stillwater, Oklahoma || 5–2 || 15–6–1 || –
|- bgcolor="#ccffcc"
| 23 || March 24 || South Dakota State || Allie P. Reynolds Stadium • Stillwater, Oklahoma || 6–2 || 16–6–1 || –
|- bgcolor="#ccffcc"
| 24 || March 24 || South Dakota State || Allie P. Reynolds Stadium • Stillwater, Oklahoma || 7–0 || 17–6–1 || –
|- bgcolor="#ccffcc"
| 25 || March 26 ||  || Allie P. Reynolds Stadium • Stillwater, Oklahoma || 3–1 || 18–6–1 || –
|- bgcolor="#ccffcc"
| 26 || March 28 ||  || Allie P. Reynolds Stadium • Stillwater, Oklahoma || 11–1 || 19–6–1 || –
|- bgcolor="#ccffcc"
| 27 || March 28 || Fort Hayes State || Allie P. Reynolds Stadium • Stillwater, Oklahoma || 21–1 || 20–6–1 || –
|- bgcolor="#ffcccc"
| 28 || March 31 ||  || Allie P. Reynolds Stadium • Stillwater, Oklahoma || 8–21 || 20–7–1 || 0–1
|- bgcolor="#ccffcc"
| 29 || March 31 || Oklahoma || Allie P. Reynolds Stadium • Stillwater, Oklahoma || 11–1 || 21–7–1 || 1–1
|-

|- bgcolor="#ccffcc"
| 30 || April 1 || Oklahoma || Allie P. Reynolds Stadium • Stillwater, Oklahoma || 11–6 || 22–7–1 || 2–1
|- bgcolor="#ccffcc"
| 31 || April 1 || Oklahoma || Allie P. Reynolds Stadium • Stillwater, Oklahoma || 8–0 || 23–7–1 || 3–1
|- bgcolor="#ccffcc"
| 32 || April 2 || at Arkansas || George Cole Field • Fayetteville, Arkansas || 14–6 || 24–7–1 || 3–1
|- bgcolor="#ccffcc"
| 33 || April 3 ||  || Allie P. Reynolds Stadium • Stillwater, Oklahoma || 13–11 || 25–7–1 || 3–1
|- bgcolor="#ccffcc"
| 34 || April 3 || Missouri Southern || Allie P. Reynolds Stadium • Stillwater, Oklahoma || 9–4 || 26–7–1 || 3–1
|- bgcolor="#ffcccc"
| 35 || April 6 || at  || KSU Baseball Stadium • Manhattan, Kansas || 2–4 || 26–8–1 || 3–2
|- bgcolor="#ccffcc"
| 36 || April 6 || at Kansas State || KSU Baseball Stadium • Manhattan, Kansas || 6–1 || 27–8–1 || 4–2
|- bgcolor="#ccffcc"
| 37 || April 7 || at Kansas State || KSU Baseball Stadium • Manhattan, Kansas || 18–2 || 28–8–1 || 5–2
|- bgcolor="#ccffcc"
| 38 || April 7 || at Kansas State || KSU Baseball Stadium • Manhattan, Kansas || 6–4 || 29–8–1 || 6–2
|- bgcolor="#ccffcc"
| 39 || April 9 || at  || Mack Park • Denton, Texas || 23–10 || 30–8–1 || 6–2
|- bgcolor="#ccffcc"
| 40 || April 9 || at North Texas State || Mack Park • Denton, Texas || 6–5 || 31–8–1 || 6–2
|- bgcolor="#ffcccc"
| 41 || April 10 ||  || Allie P. Reynolds Stadium • Stillwater, Oklahoma || 9–11 || 31–9–1 || 6–2
|- bgcolor="#ccffcc"
| 42 || April 12 ||  || Allie P. Reynolds Stadium • Stillwater, Oklahoma || 21–1 || 32–9–1 || 6–2
|- bgcolor="#ccffcc"
| 43 || April 12 || Saint Louis || Allie P. Reynolds Stadium • Stillwater, Oklahoma || 15–5 || 33–9–1 || 6–2
|- bgcolor="#ccffcc"
| 44 || April 13 || Saint Louis || Allie P. Reynolds Stadium • Stillwater, Oklahoma || 14–1 || 34–9–1 || 6–2
|- bgcolor="#ccffcc"
| 45 || April 14 || at Texas || Disch–Falk Field • Austin, Texas || 4–9 || 35–9–1 || 6–2
|- bgcolor="#ffcccc"
| 46 || April 15 || at Texas || Disch–Falk Field • Austin, Texas || 12–13 || 35–10–1 || 6–2
|- bgcolor="#ccffcc"
| 47 || April 19 || at  || Simmons Field • Columbia, Missouri || 10–8 || 36–10–1 || 7–2
|- bgcolor="#ccffcc"
| 48 || April 20 || at Missouri || Simmons Field • Columbia, Missouri || 17–16 || 37–10–1 || 8–2
|- bgcolor="#ccffcc"
| 49 || April 20 || at Missouri || Simmons Field • Columbia, Missouri || 6–4 || 38–10–1 || 9–2
|- bgcolor="#ccffcc"
| 50 || April 21 || at Missouri || Simmons Field • Columbia, Missouri || 20–4 || 39–10–1 || 10–2
|- bgcolor="#ccffcc"
| 51 || April 24 || at Wichita State || Eck Stadium • Wichita, Kansas || 8–4 || 40–10–1 || 10–2
|- bgcolor="#ccffcc"
| 52 || April 27 || at  || Unknown • Lawrence, Kansas || 25–19 || 41–10–1 || 11–2
|- bgcolor="#ccffcc"
| 53 || April 27 || at Kansas || Unknown • Lawrence, Kansas || 22–1 || 42–10–1 || 12–2
|- bgcolor="#ccffcc"
| 54 || April 28 || at Kansas || Unknown • Lawrence, Kansas || 8–4 || 43–10–1 || 13–2
|- bgcolor="#ccffcc"
| 55 || April 28 || at Kansas || Unknown • Lawrence, Kansas || 13–3 || 44–10–1 || 14–2
|- bgcolor="#ccffcc"
| 56 || April 30 || Kansas State || Allie P. Reynolds Stadium • Stillwater, Oklahoma || 12–1 || 45–10–1 || 14–2
|-

|- bgcolor="#ccffcc"
| 57 || May 2 || North Texas State || Allie P. Reynolds Stadium • Stillwater, Oklahoma || 5–4 || 46–10–1 || 14–2
|- bgcolor="#ccffcc"
| 58 || May 2 || North Texas State || Allie P. Reynolds Stadium • Stillwater, Oklahoma || 6–5 || 47–10–1 || 14–2
|- bgcolor="#ffcccc"
| 59 || May 4 ||  || Allie P. Reynolds Stadium • Stillwater, Oklahoma || 8–21 || 47–11–1 || 14–3
|- bgcolor="#ffcccc"
| 60 || May 4 || Nebraska || Allie P. Reynolds Stadium • Stillwater, Oklahoma || 5–11 || 47–12–1 || 14–4
|- bgcolor="#ccffcc"
| 61 || May 5 || Nebraska || Allie P. Reynolds Stadium • Stillwater, Oklahoma || 24–9 || 48–12–1 || 15–4
|- bgcolor="#ccffcc"
| 62 || May 5 || Nebraska || Allie P. Reynolds Stadium • Stillwater, Oklahoma || 16–9 || 49–12–1 || 16–4
|- bgcolor="#ffcccc"
| 63 || May 11 || at  || Cap Timm Field • Ames, Iowa || 7–9 || 49–13–1 || 16–5
|- bgcolor="#ccffcc"
| 64 || May 11 || at Iowa State || Cap Timm Field • Ames, Iowa || 14–2 || 50–13–1 || 17–5
|- bgcolor="#ccffcc"
| 65 || May 12 || at Iowa State || Cap Timm Field • Ames, Iowa || 18–7 || 51–13–1 || 18–5
|-

|-
|-
! style="" | Postseason
|- valign="top" 

|- bgcolor="#ccffcc"
| 66 || May 15 || vs Kansas State || Unknown • Oklahoma City, Oklahoma || 10–4 || 52–13–1 || 18–5
|- bgcolor="#ccffcc"
| 67 || May 16 || vs Oklahoma || Unknown • Oklahoma City, Oklahoma || 11–5 || 53–13–1 || 18–5
|- bgcolor="#ccffcc"
| 68 || May 16 || vs Oklahoma || Unknown • Oklahoma City, Oklahoma || 19–4 || 54–13–1 || 18–5
|-

|- bgcolor="#ccffcc"
| 69 || May 24 ||  || Allie P. Reynolds Stadium • Stillwater, Oklahoma || 8–3 || 55–13–1 || 18–5
|- bgcolor="#ccffcc"
| 70 || May 25 || Wichita State || Allie P. Reynolds Stadium • Stillwater, Oklahoma || 15–8 || 56–13–1 || 18–5
|- bgcolor="#ffcccc"
| 71 || May 26 || Wichita State || Allie P. Reynolds Stadium • Stillwater, Oklahoma || 2–7 || 56–14–1 || 18–5
|- bgcolor="#ccffcc"
| 72 || May 27 || Wichita State || Allie P. Reynolds Stadium • Stillwater, Oklahoma || 10–6 || 57–14–1 || 18–5
|-

|- bgcolor="#ffcccc"
| 73 || May 31 || vs  || Johnny Rosenblatt Stadium • Omaha, Nebraska || 3–12 || 57–15–1 || 18–5
|- bgcolor="#ccffcc"
| 74 || June 2 || vs  || Johnny Rosenblatt Stadium • Omaha, Nebraska || 16–11 || 58–15–1 || 18–5
|- bgcolor="#ffcccc"
| 75 || June 6 || vs Miami (FL) || Johnny Rosenblatt Stadium • Omaha, Nebraska || 1–2 || 58–16–1 || 18–5
|-

Awards and honors 
Jeff Bronkey
College World Series All-Tournament Team

Doug Dascenzo
All-Big Eight Conference
Big Eight Conference All-Tournament Team

Mike Day
Big Eight Conference All-Tournament Team

Sergio Espinal
Big Eight Conference All-Tournament Team

Pete Incaviglia
All-Big Eight Conference
Big Eight Conference All-Tournament Team
First Team All-American Baseball America
First Team All-American American Baseball Coaches Association

Kevin Fowler
All-Big Eight Conference

Randy Whisler
College World Series All-Tournament Team

References

Oklahoma State Cowboys baseball seasons
Oklahoma State Cowboys baseball
College World Series seasons
Oklahoma State
Big Eight Conference baseball champion seasons